Bartnes may refer to the following:

Places
Bartnes, Trøndelag, a village in the municipality of Steinkjer in Trøndelag county, Norway
Bartnes Church, a church in the village of Bartnes in the municipality of Steinkjer in Trøndelag county, Norway

People
Erik Bartnes (born 1939), a Norwegian politician
Inge Bartnes (born 1970), a Norwegian politician
Inge Einarsen Bartnes (1911–1988), a Norwegian politician
Lars Erik Bartnes (born 1978), a Norwegian politician
Martin Bartnes (born 1978), a Norwegian ski mountaineer and cross-country skier